This article is about the particular significance of the year 1832 to Wales and its people.

Incumbents
Lord Lieutenant of Anglesey – Henry Paget, 1st Marquess of Anglesey 
Lord Lieutenant of Brecknockshire – Henry Somerset, 6th Duke of Beaufort
Lord Lieutenant of Caernarvonshire – Peter Drummond-Burrell, 22nd Baron Willoughby de Eresby 
Lord Lieutenant of Cardiganshire – William Edward Powell
Lord Lieutenant of Carmarthenshire – George Rice, 3rd Baron Dynevor 
Lord Lieutenant of Denbighshire – Sir Watkin Williams-Wynn, 5th Baronet    
Lord Lieutenant of Flintshire – Robert Grosvenor, 1st Marquess of Westminster 
Lord Lieutenant of Glamorgan – John Crichton-Stuart, 2nd Marquess of Bute 
Lord Lieutenant of Merionethshire – Sir Watkin Williams-Wynn, 5th Baronet
Lord Lieutenant of Montgomeryshire – Edward Herbert, 2nd Earl of Powis
Lord Lieutenant of Pembrokeshire – Sir John Owen, 1st Baronet
Lord Lieutenant of Radnorshire – George Rodney, 3rd Baron Rodney

Bishop of Bangor – Christopher Bethell 
Bishop of Llandaff – Edward Copleston 
Bishop of St Asaph – William Carey 
Bishop of St Davids – John Jenkinson

Events
13 January — The Welshman (newspaper) is first published in Carmarthen.
May — Second cholera pandemic reaches Wales, at Flint.
23 May — The Festiniog Railway Company is set up by Act of Parliament, making it, as of the 21st century, the world's oldest surviving statutory public railway company.
August - Princess Victoria and her mother, the Duchess of Kent, visit Wynnstay.
28 August - At the Beaumaris eisteddfod, the title of Archdruid is used for the first time.
8 December–8 January 1833 — In the 1832 United Kingdom general election, the first following the Reform Act 1832, John Josiah Guest becomes the first MP for the new constituency of Merthyr Boroughs.
The first temperance society in Wales is founded at Holyhead.
Wrexham Infirmary is founded at the instigation of Thomas Taylor Griffith.
New Cardiff Prison opens.
Walter Coffin opens the "Rhondda No. 3" coal seam.

Arts and literature

New books
Benjamin Jones (P A Môn) — Amddiffyniad o Brynedigaeth Neillduol
Jedediah Richards — Addysg ac Amddiffyniad

Music

Births
5 January – Love Jones-Parry, politician and Patagonian settler (d. 1891)
3 April – William Thomas (Islwyn), poet (d. 1878)
25 September – John Ceiriog Hughes, poet (d. 1887)
4 November – James James (Iago ap Ieuan), harpist and composer (d. 1902)
19 November – Benjamin Thomas Williams, lawyer and politician (d. 1890)
17 December – Thomas McKenny Hughes, geologist (d. 1917)
date unknown – William Williams, veterinary surgeon (d. 1900)

Deaths
23 February – Owen Williams (MP), 67
16 July – Jemima Nicholas, heroine, 82
14 August – Evan Pritchard (Ieuan Lleyn), poet, 63
18 November – William Howels or Howells, evangelical preacher, 54

References

Wales